Zineddine Boutmène (born 23 March 2000) is an Algerian international footballer who plays for ES Sahel in the Tunisian Ligue Professionnelle 1.

Honours
Algeria
FIFA Arab Cup: 2021

References

2000 births
Living people
Algerian footballers
Association football midfielders
NA Hussein Dey players
Club Africain players
Étoile Sportive du Sahel players
21st-century Algerian people